The following tables show the List of world records in athletics progression in the 50K run, as recognised by World Athletics. The 50K run was introduced as a world record event in July 2021 during the federation's Council meeting in Tokyo.

World record progression

Key to tables

Men

Women

Women only race

Mixed gender race

See also
Ultramarathon
IAU 50 km World Championships

References

50 km